Sandra Sánchez Jaime (born 16 September 1981) is a retired Spanish karateka. She won the gold medal in the women's kata event at the 2020 Summer Olympics in Tokyo, Japan. She is a two-time gold medalist in the women's individual kata event at the World Karate Championships (2018 and 2021). She also won the gold medal in this event at the European Karate Championships in seven consecutive competitions (2015 – 2022). She is also recognised by Guinness World Records for winning the most medals in the Karate1 Premier League; she won 35 consecutive medals between January 2014 and February 2020.

Career 

In 2015, she won the gold medal in the women's kata event at the European Karate Championships held in Istanbul, Turkey. In the same year, she also won the gold medal in the women's kata event at the European Games held in Baku, Azerbaijan. In the final, she defeated Sandy Scordo of France.

At the 2016 World Karate Championships held in Linz, Austria, she won one of the bronze medals in the women's individual kata event. In 2017, she won the silver medal in the women's kata event at the World Games held in Wrocław, Poland. In the final, she lost against Kiyou Shimizu of Japan.

In 2018, she won the gold medal in her event at both the European Karate Championships held in Novi Sad, Serbia and the World Karate Championships held in Madrid, Spain.

She won the gold medal in the women's kata event at the 2019 European Karate Championships held in Guadalajara, Spain. In the same year, she also represented Spain at the European Games in Minsk, Belarus and she won the gold medal in the women's individual kata event. Lastly, she also won the gold medal in the women's individual kata event at the 2019 World Beach Games held in Doha, Qatar.

In May 2021, she secured the gold medal in her event at the European Karate Championships held in Poreč, Croatia. She also represented Spain at the 2020 Summer Olympics in Tokyo, Japan. She won the gold medal in the women's kata event. In November 2021, she won the gold medal in the women's kata event at the World Karate Championships held in Dubai, United Arab Emirates.

She won the gold medal in the women's individual kata event at the 2022 European Karate Championships held in 
Gaziantep, Turkey. She also won the gold medal in her event at the 2022 World Games held in Birmingham, United States.

She retired from competitive sports after the 2022 World Games.

Achievements

References

External links 

 
 

1981 births
Living people
Spanish female karateka
Karateka at the 2019 European Games
European Games gold medalists for Spain
European Games medalists in karate
Competitors at the 2017 World Games
Competitors at the 2022 World Games
World Games gold medalists
World Games silver medalists
World Games medalists in karate
Guinness World Records
Karateka at the 2020 Summer Olympics
Medalists at the 2020 Summer Olympics
Olympic medalists in karate
Olympic gold medalists for Spain
Olympic karateka of Spain
21st-century Spanish women